Saanich (also Sənčáθən, written as  in Saanich orthography and pronounced ) is the language of the First Nations Saanich people in the Pacific Northwest region of northwestern North America. Saanich is a Coast Salishan language in the Northern Straits dialect continuum, the varieties of which are closely related to the Klallam language.

Language revitalization efforts 
"The  School Board, together with the FirstVoices program for revitalizing Aboriginal languages, is working to teach a new generation to speak " at the ȽÁU,WELṈEW̱ Tribal School.

SENĆOŦEN texting, mobile app and portal 
A Saanich texting app was released in 2012. A SENĆOŦEN iPhone app was released in October 2011. An online dictionary, phrasebook, and language learning portal is available at the First Voices SENĆOŦEN Community Portal.

Phonology

Vowels
Saanich has no rounded vowels in native vocabulary. As in many languages, vowels are strongly affected by post-velar consonants.

Consonants
The following table includes all the sounds found in the North Straits dialects. No one dialect includes them all. Plosives are not aspirated, but are not voiced either. Ejectives have weak glottalization.

The alveolars , on the other hand, are apical, as are all alveolars, including the laterals.

Stress
Saanich stress is phonemic. Each full word has one stressed syllable, either in the root or in a suffix, the position of which is lexically determined. "Secondary stress" is sometimes described, but this is merely a way of distinguishing lexical schwas (with "secondary stress", like all other vowels in a word) from epenthetic schwas ("unstressed").

Writing system

The Saanich orthography was created by Dave Elliott in 1978. It uses only uppercase letters, making it a unicase alphabet, with one exception: the letter , which marks the third person possessive suffix.

The glottal stop  is not always indicated, but may be written with a comma: ,.

Plain and glottalized resonants are not distinguished.

The vowel  is usually written Á, unless it occurs next to a post-velar consonant, where it is written A.

Example text
Article 1 of the Universal Declaration of Human Rights:

Grammar

Metathesis
In Saanich, metathesis is used as a grammatical device to indicate "actual" aspect.  The actual aspect is most often translated into English as a be …-ing progressive. The actual aspect is derived from the "nonactual" verb form by a CV → VC metathesis process (i.e. consonant metathesizes with vowel).

References

Bibliography
Bill, Adriane; Cayou, Roxanne; & Jim, Jacquelin. (2003). NEȾE NEḰȺ SḴELÁLṈEW̲ [One Green Tree]. Victoria, B.C.: First Peoples’ Cultural Foundation & ȽÁU,WELṈEW̲ Tribal School. .
Mithun, Marianne. (1999). The Languages of Native North America. Cambridge: Cambridge University Press.  (hbk); .
Montler, Timothy. (1986). An Outline of the Morphology and Phonology of Saanich, North Straits Salish. Occasional Papers in Linguistics (No. 4). Missoula, MT: University of Montana Linguistics Laboratory. (Web version of the author's PhD dissertation, University of Hawaii).
Montler, Timothy. (1996). Languages and Dialects in Straits Salishan. Proceedings of the International Conference on Salish and Neighboring Languages, 31, 249–256.
Montler, Timothy. (1999). Language and Dialect Variation in Straits Salishan. Anthropological Linguistics, 41 (4), 462–502.
Montler, Timothy. (2018). SENĆOŦEN: A Dictionary of the Saanich Language. Seattle: University of Washington Press.
Thompson, Laurence; Thompson, M. Terry; & Efrat, Barbara. (1974). Some Phonological Developments in Straits Salish. International Journal of American Linguistics, 40, 182–196.
YELḰÁTȾE [Claxton, Earl, Sr.]; & STOLȻEȽ [Elliot, John, Sr.]. (1994). Reef Net Technology of the Saltwater People. Brentwood Bay, B.C.: Saanich Indian School Board.

External links
How to pronounce SENĆOŦEN
An Outline of the Morphology and Phonology of Saanich, North Straits Salish (1986) (Timothy Montler's site)
Phonology
Morphology
Sample text
https://www.smg.surrey.ac.uk/saanich-verbs/
Saanich Classified Word List (1991) (Timothy Montler's site)
SENĆOŦEN (Saanich, Northern Straits Salish) (Chris Harvey's Native Language, Font & Keyboard)
Saanich Indian School Board
SENĆOŦEN Welcome page (First Voices)

North Straits Salish languages
Indigenous languages of the Pacific Northwest Coast
First Nations languages in Canada